Radinovići is a village in the municipality of Zenica, Bosnia and Herzegovina. It is located on the slopes of Lastavica mountain, east of the city.

Demographics 
According to the 2013 census, population of Radinovići was 180, all ethnic Bosniaks.

References

Populated places in Zenica